Eastport is an unincorporated community and census-designated place (CDP) located in Antrim County in the U.S. state of Michigan. The population of the CDP was 206 at the 2020 census. It is located in Torch Lake Township, and lies on an isthmus between Torch Lake and Grand Traverse Bay.

History
The area was settled by lumberman Murdock Andress in 1863, and a hotel was built in 1869.  A post office named Wilson opened on March 29, 1872.  It was renamed Eastport on September 8, 1873.  The community became a popular shipping area along the east coast Grand Traverse Bay and the northern shores of Torch Lake.  The name Eastport was derived from its eastern location along the bay, which was directly across the bay from Northport.  

The community of Eastport was listed as a newly-organized census-designated place for the 2010 census, meaning it now has officially defined boundaries and population statistics for the first time.

Geography

Demographics

References

Unincorporated communities in Antrim County, Michigan
Census-designated places in Michigan
1863 establishments in Michigan
Populated places established in 1863
Unincorporated communities in Michigan
Census-designated places in Antrim County, Michigan
Michigan populated places on Lake Michigan